Anolis amplisquamosus is a species of lizard in the family Dactyloidae. The species is found in Honduras.

References

Anoles
Reptiles of Honduras
Endemic fauna of Honduras
Reptiles described in 1993
Taxa named by James Randall McCranie
Taxa named by Kenneth L. Williams